State Route 6 (SR 6) is a state highway that is unsigned. It travels through the central part of the U.S. state of Tennessee. It travels from Lawrence County to Sumner County. The highway is related to the following U.S. Highways:

U.S. Route 43 (US 43) from the Alabama state line to Columbia
US 31 from Columbia to Nashville
US 31E from Nashville to the Kentucky state line

TDOT designations 
Most of State Route 6 is a primary highway; however, between SR 397 in Frankiln and SR 254 right past the Davidson County line to SR 155 are all the areas where State Route 6 is secondary. There is ambiguity between the two Davidson County Functional Classification Maps (19b & 19a) and the TDOT Traffic Map information is not consistent designations of the Primary and Secondary route in Davidson County.

006
Transportation in Nashville, Tennessee
Transportation in Lawrence County, Tennessee
Transportation in Maury County, Tennessee
Transportation in Williamson County, Tennessee
Transportation in Davidson County, Tennessee
Transportation in Sumner County, Tennessee